Claude Newman was a British ballet dancer with the Vic-Wells Ballet.

He had lead roles in Frederick Ashton's The Wise Virgins and Ninette de Valois' The Prospect Before Us.

By 1943, Newman was the company's ballet master.

In 1943, he danced The Lepidopterist in de Valois' Promenade.

References

British male ballet dancers
Year of birth missing
Place of birth missing
Ballet masters